Mannchalay is a Pakistani comedy TV drama serial that was televised on Hum TV. The serial was written by Faiza Iftikhar and directed by Roomi Insha. It highlights the difference in thinking between the younger and older generations and shows how two generations can walk forward hand-in-hand.

Plot
Mannchalay is the story of the Khawaja family. Khawaja Sahab is the head of the family. He is a loving father, however, he is conservative as well. He has three sons, Furqan, Usman, and Jibran and wants the three brothers to marry three sisters named Mehnaz, Nazia and Fiza to keep the family united. However, the youngest son, Jibran likes another girl named Mitthu.

Cast 
Qavi Khan as Khawaja Sahab
Seemi Raheel as Sabiha Begum
Danish Taimoor as Jibran, Khawaja and Sabiha's youngest son
Sanam Baloch as Mitthu, Jibran's love interest and then wife
Farhan Ally Agha as Furqan Khawaja, Khawaja Sahab's elder son
Nausheen Shah as Mehnaz, Usman's wife
Hassan Ahmed as Usman Khawaja, khawaja Sahab's younger son
Eshita Mehboob as Nazia, Furqan's wife

See also 
 Noorpur Ki Rani
 Aashti
 Dil, Diya, Dehleez
 Manay Na Ye Dil
 Malaal

References

External links
 
 

2009 Pakistani television series debuts
2010 Pakistani television series endings
Pakistani drama television series
Urdu-language television shows
Television shows set in Karachi
Hum TV original programming